Chauncey W. Yockey (March 28, 1877 – November 28, 1936) was an American lawyer and politician.

Life
Yockey was born in Waupun, Wisconsin on March 28, 1877, the son of William Henry Yockey (1853–1917) and Ella B. Yockey (née McHugh, 1854–1921). He grew up in Escanaba, Michigan and graduated from St. Joseph's High School. Yockey received his bachelor's degree from St. Mary's College in Dayton, Ohio (now the University of Dayton) and his law degree from the Notre Dame Law School. Yockey died at Saint Camillus Hospital in Milwaukee from a heart ailment.

Career
Yockey practiced law in Milwaukee, Wisconsin in partnership with his brother, Edward. Yockey served on the Milwaukee Common Council and on the Milwaukee Police and Fire Commission. In 1911, Yockey served in the Wisconsin State Assembly and was a Republican. Yockey was active in the Benevolent and Protective Order of Elks and served as the Exalted Ruler of the Milwaukee Lodge for seventeen years, and a former Exalted Ruler of the Wisconsin State Association. Wisconsin Governor Philip La Follette appointed Yockey the official  greeter for the state of Wisconsin. He was also the official greeter for the city of Milwaukee.

Notes

1877 births
1936 deaths
Greeters
People from Escanaba, Michigan
Politicians from Milwaukee
People from Waupun, Wisconsin
University of Dayton alumni
Notre Dame Law School alumni
Milwaukee Common Council members
Republican Party members of the Wisconsin State Assembly
Lawyers from Milwaukee